RGL and similar may refer to:
 RijnGouweLijn, a proposed light rail project in South Holland, Netherlands
 Piloto Civil Norberto Fernández International Airport (IATA code), Río Gallegos, Santa Cruz Province, Argentina
 Rugeley Trent Valley railway station (National Rail code), Staffordshire, England
 RGL2, a human gene that makes the protein "Ral guanine nucleotide dissociation stimulator-like 2"
 RGL4, a bacterial gene that makes the enzyme Rhamnogalacturonan endolyase
 RGLI, the Royal Guernsey Light Infantry, a WWI army regiment
 RGL Music Productions B.V.